The Oklahoma School of Science and Mathematics (OSSM) is a two-year, public residential high school located in Oklahoma City, Oklahoma. Established by the Oklahoma state legislature in 1983, the school was designed to educate academically gifted high school juniors and seniors in advanced mathematics and science. OSSM opened doors to its inaugural class in 1990. It is a member of the National Consortium of Secondary STEM Schools (NCSSS).

History
Dr. Earl Mitchell is credited as the originator of the idea of starting OSSM. He was reportedly inspired by a letter about the North Carolina School of Science and Mathematics (NCSSM), written by North Carolina governor Jim Hunt. In 1982, Dr. Mitchell travelled to NCSSM to study their practices, and enlisted Speaker Dan Draper, Representative Penny Williams, and Senator Bernice Shedrick to help bring the idea to fruition.

OSSM was established by HB 1286 in 1983, during the 39th Oklahoma Legislature. The bill's principal authors included Representative Penny Williams, Senator Bernice Shedrick, and Senator Rodger Randle. The bill was signed into law by Governor George Nigh on June 23, 1983.

In 1988, Dr. Edna Manning was appointed the first president of OSSM. Manning aided in the building and development of the institution, supervising the selection of faculty and the development of the curriculum.

When OSSM's inaugural class was accepted in 1990, the school did not have its own campus yet. Students were temporarily housed in OU's Cross Center dormitory in Norman, and took daily shuttle buses to the OU Health Sciences Center (OUHSC) campus in Oklahoma City for their classes.
In 1992, OSSM moved into the newly-renovated Lincoln Elementary School, across the street from the OUHSC. During Dr. Manning's tenure as president, the school's campus grew to include a dormitory, a gymnasium, a library, and a science building.

In 2006, Chesapeake Energy gifted OSSM $500,000 to fund an endowed faculty chair in geophysics, the first endowed chair at an Oklahoma public high school.

In June 2012, Dr. Manning retired from her position as president, and was succeeded by Dr. Frank Y.H. Wang. During his tenure, Dr. Wang increased contributions to the OSSM Foundation Faculty Endowment from $4.2 million to $10 million.

On May 31, 2013, the 54th Oklahoma Legislature passed SB 1131, authored by Senator Clark Jolley, and signed into law by Governor Mary Fallin. The bill allows OSSM to accept out-of-state students for up to 10 percent of the student population and charge them tuition. It also allows the school to rent out its facilities, and create summer programs & workshops for which tuition and fees could be charged. Dr. Wang helped create the bill in an effort to generate a new revenue stream, to make up for money lost to severe cuts in state funding.

In June 2021, Dr. Wang announced he will retire at the end of the 2021-22 school year.

General
Admittance to OSSM is conducted through a highly selective application process, with acceptance rates varying over time. The application process consists of five short essays, submission of high school transcripts and standardized test scores (such as the ACT), recommendations from teachers and counselors, personal questionnaires of the student, a statement from the student's parents, and an on-campus interview.

Students are accepted from all over the state of Oklahoma, and students from each of Oklahoma's 77 counties have been selected to attend. Because students hail from across the state, all are required to live on campus during the week. Classes are held five days a week, with the earliest classes starting at 8am and the latest ending at 5:30pm. Some classes, such as astronomy lab and special topics classes, are held at night. Most students have breaks throughout the day depending on their individual, college-style schedule. Students are not allowed in the dorm during their breaks in the academic day, but are to stay academically engaged during these periods.  Required physical education classes are held in the afternoon with each student participating in 45 minutes of supervised physical activity twice a week. Fine arts classes (two semesters are required for graduation) are also held in the evenings. One Saturday a month, students are required to take a three-hour test in math, physics, literature, history, or a national standardized test (ACT, SAT, or PSAT). Two weekends a month is called an open weekend, with the students allowed to either go home or stay in the dorms, and the other weekend is an extended weekend with all students required to leave campus.

As part of OSSM's academic program, two hours of study are required each weeknight from 8 to 10pm, with students on structured study (resulting from unfortunate grades) required to study for an additional hour each night, beginning at 7pm. Lights out is at 11pm every night of the week, and internet access is shut off in the dormitories at that time. OSSM fulfills its educational mission at no charge to its students: tuition, books and other class materials, as well as room and board, are all provided by the taxpayers of the State of Oklahoma.

One hundred percent of OSSM graduates are college-bound, and approximately 60% of OSSM graduates choose to remain in-state for college. Of the 1,211 (as of May 2011) graduates since the school's inception, 323 students have been named National Merit Scholars, and an additional 167 students have been selected as National Merit Commended Scholars. Graduates also show exemplary performance in other national scholarship programs, with 227 graduates selected as Robert C. Byrd Scholars, and 124 students nominated for the Presidential Scholars Program, of whom thirteen were named semifinalists and five selected as Presidential Scholars. Graduates excel in statewide scholarship programs, with 553 students receiving Oklahoma State Regents for Higher Education Scholarships and 92 students named Academic All-Staters by the Oklahoma Foundation for Excellence. Twice, in 1998 and again in 2000, the school had the highest ACT composite scores of any high school in the nation. OSSM is also listed as one of the best public high schools in the nation by the Washington Post, in a list of top-performing schools with elite students.

Academics

OSSM's graduation requirements include four semesters of History, four semesters of Literature, two years of the same foreign language (unless this was completed at the student's previous high school), one semester of computer science, four semesters of mathematics including math through Calculus II, three semesters of physics including physics through Electricity and Magnetism, two semesters of chemistry, two semesters of biology, four semesters of physical education, two semesters of fine arts, and two semesters of science, math, or computer science electives. OSSM regularly offers the following classes:

Additionally, students may arrange to take directed studies with faculty members. Many OSSM students choose to participate in the mentorship program in their senior year, in which they perform research with a mentor (who may be an OSSM faculty member, or an off campus expert).

Campus

OSSM is located on thirty-two acres at the northwest corner of 10th Avenue and Lincoln Boulevard near downtown Oklahoma City, near the University of Oklahoma Health Sciences Center. Its main academic building, Lincoln School, was built in 1903, and used as an elementary school, then torn down and rebuilt in 1948 Oklahoma City Public Schools and used until the 1980s. This building houses a computer lab, the campus auditorium, nineteen classrooms, six labs, a student lounge, a study area, basement, and faculty and administrative offices. The Dan Little Residence Hall, with a capacity of nearly 300 students and twelve faculty families, was completed in 1998, located at the center of campus, complete with a basement containing billiards, game tables, and a TV for students to use during their nightly free time. The basement is also a reinforced storm shelter and is large enough to house the entire school population.  The Gymnasium, opened in March 1999, provides a full-size basketball court, a weight room, and a dance floor, among other amenities. The Samson Science and Discovery Center was completed in 2001 and houses three chemistry labs, four physics labs, one computer lab, and one demonstration/lecture room, as well as many personal research labs. In Fall 2003, the Senator Bernice Shedrick Library opened, with a capacity of 50,000 books and 10 computers for student use.

Demographics
 Student Body: 144
 Average Class Size: 15–18, though many upper-level classes are smaller
 Male-Female Ratio: 1:1

Notable alumni
 Rhiju Das, '95
 Nancy Chen

See also
 Alabama School of Mathematics and Science
 Arkansas School for Mathematics, Sciences, and the Arts
 Carol Martin Gatton Academy of Mathematics and Science in Kentucky
 Craft Academy for Excellence in Science and Mathematics
 Illinois Mathematics and Science Academy
 Indiana Academy for Science, Mathematics, and Humanities
 Kansas Academy of Mathematics and Science
 Louisiana School for Math, Science, and the Arts
 Maine School of Science and Mathematics 
 Mississippi School for Mathematics and Science
 North Carolina School of Science and Mathematics
 South Carolina Governor's School for Science and Mathematics
 Texas Academy of Mathematics and Science

References
 6. https://cen.acs.org/articles/93/i35/Oklahoma-Chemist-AwardK-Fazlur-Rahman.html#:~:text=A.K.%20Fazlur%20Rahman-,A.%20K.,of%20a%20plaque%20and%20%241%2C000.
7.https://www.inverse.com/article/44254-high-school-student-george-wang-carbon-7-bonds

8. https://stateimpact.npr.org/oklahoma/2018/05/10/oklahoma-high-school-student-makes-scientific-discovery-by-questioning-common-knowledge/#:~:text=George%20Wang%2C%20a%20senior%20at,in%20Oklahoma%20City%2C%20is%20ecstatic.

9. Ab initio calculations of ionic hydrocarbon compounds with heptacoordinate carbon, G. Wang, A. K. F. Rahman, Bin Wang*, J. Mol. Model. 24, 116 (2018)
+ This work has been featured on a few public media, including a feature story "Oklahoma High School Student Makes Scientific Discovery By Questioning Common Knowledge" at the STATEIMPACT Oklahoma, Oklahoma Radio NPR, "A High Schooler Has Upended a Fundamental Chemistry Theory" at INVERSE,  "A High School Kid From Oklahoma Just Made A Massive Breakthrough In Chemistry" at IFL Science, and a broad discussion on Reddit.

External links
 
 The OSSM Foundation

Boarding schools in Oklahoma
Schools in Oklahoma City
Educational institutions established in 1983
Gifted education
Public high schools in Oklahoma
NCSSS schools
1983 establishments in Oklahoma
Public boarding schools in the United States